The Desperate Mission is a 1969 American made-for-television western film directed by Earl Bellamy. The production was a joint project of  20th Century Fox Television, Montalban Enterprises Production, and Twentieth Century Fox Film Corporation.

Plot summary
The story is a fictionalization of the life of Joaquin Murrieta.

Cast
 Ricardo Montalban as Joaquin Murrieta
 Slim Pickens as Three-Finger Jack
 Roosevelt Grier as Morgan
 Jim McMullan as Arkansaw
 Earl Holliman as Shad Clay
 Ina Balin as Otilia Ruiz
 Robert J. Wilke as Gant
 Miriam Colon as Claudina, Otilia's Servant
 Anthony Caruso as Don Miguel Ruiz
 Eddra Gale as Dolores the Bartender
 Armando Silvestre as Diego Campos, Don Miguel's Man
 José Chávez as First Monk
 Ben Archibek as Frankie Gant
 Pancho Córdova as Father Augustine (as Francisco de Córdova)
 Charles Horvath as Yuma
 Allen Pinson as Corncracker
 Eldon Burke as Galvez
 Barbara Turner as The Farmer's Wife

References

External links
 
 

1969 television films
1969 films
Films directed by Earl Bellamy
NBC network original films
1960s English-language films